Höhenkirchen-Siegertsbrunn is a station on the Munich S-Bahn network on the Munich-Giesing–Kreuzstraße railway.  It is located in the community of Höhenkirchen-Siegertsbrunn, south-east of Munich. It has two side-platforms with a large distance between the tracks.  It is served by line S7 in a twenty-minute rhythm. A third of the outbound trains terminate here, the rest continues further to Aying or Kreuzstraße. Before 2005 the station had one island-platform, which was demolished after the opening of the two side-platforms in 2005.  The station is staffed: tickets can be purchased at the DB store. The station facilities are: toilets, a bus stop, bicycle stands and P+R (park and ride). The station is located at the ground level so it is accessible by wheelchair. The north half of both platforms is covered by a roof. The travel time to Marienplatz is approximately 30 minutes.

References

Munich S-Bahn stations